The Daily News is an American, English language newspaper serving Batavia, New York and surrounding environs. Originally billed as the "Official Paper of the Village", it was known as The Batavia Daily News from 1879 through1881, and the Daily Morning News from 1878 to 1879.

Published from the county seat of Genesee County, the paper also serves portions of neighboring Wyoming and Orleans counties. It is published six days a week, Monday through Saturday. Its circulation estimate is 10,500 copies in 2018, and it is currently owned by Johnson Newspaper Corporation.

History 
The Daily News began publication on 25 June 1878. From 1881 to 1938, G.S. Griswold served as publisher along with partner McWain. A prominent member of the community, he was one of the charter members of the Associated Press and its one-time president. In 1897, the Daily News bought The Batavian, a rival weekly that had operated since 1868. Enlarging it, they turned it from an independent paper to a Republican one.

In 1984, The Daily News won a USA Today printing contract for regional printing of USA Today serving Western New York, resulting in a printing plant expansion. This contract was ended in summer 2009.

Tom Turnbull was publisher from 2002 to 2013. On 17 February 2010 the Batavia Daily News joined the YouTube Channel. Then on 30 August the Buffalo News started to print the Batavia Daily News among other papers.

On 20 September 2014, the newspaper's historic headquarters building was sold to an outside buyer. During 2015, long time Managing Editor Mark Graczyk left and was succeeded by Tiffany Towner; in September 2017, John Anderson replaced Towner as managing editor. Then later in 2019 Ben Beagle took over the job.

The Batavia Daily News switched in 2019 from publishing six days a week to a five day cycle, Tuesday–Saturday.

A 2009 poll in The Batavian, an online news site and a competitor to the Batavia Daily News founded in 2008, indicated that 37.2 percent of respondents felt that partisanship did not figure into The Daily News coverage, while 23.4 percent of respondents felt it leaned Republican, and 17.9 percent felt it leaned Democrat. 21.1 percent answered, "not sure."

Awards and recognition

During the 2013 Awards of the New York State Associated Press Association (NYSAPA) in the Under 15,000 circulation the following rewards were acknowledged: Features Reporting, 2nd Place - Wrongfully Accused by Scott DeSmit; Continuing Coverage, 3rd Place - Council votes "out of the trash business" by Joanne Beck (past employee); Sports Photography, 3rd Sports - Mixed Emotions by Mark Gutman. In 2015 the following members were reward of their hard work by the NYSAPA Division 1 (Circulation under 15,000): Best Arts/Entertainment Reporting, 3rd Place - "Foreigner: Attica chic to perform with famous rockers" by Matt Krueger (past employee); Best Sports Story, 3rd Place -  "Leaving their Field of Dreams" by Nate Rider; Best Illustration or Graphic, 1st Place - "Cupid in Training".

The National Press Photography Association (NPPA) of the Region 2 area of the same year recognized past Chief Photographer Rocco Laurienzo for 3rd place in February for Spot News and September in General News. Staff Photographer, Mark Gutman placed 1st in the month of July for Feature/Single. Gutman also placed 2nd in April for Sports and Feature/Single Picture plus in September in Spot News and November as well in the same category.

The Daily News employees were also being recognized by the New York News Publishers Association, Inc. (NYNPA) in Under 10,000 Circulation Class. In Distinguished Sports Column Writing won by Bill Bruton; Photographer Mark Gutman won the following awards: Distinguished News Photography - "Working in the shadows", Distinguished Feature Photography - "Thrill of a lifetime" and Distinguished Sports Photography - "Dusty run".

In 2016 the NYNPA recognized News staff in the Under 10,000 Circulation Class in the following categories: Distinguished Column Writing for columns by Scott DeSmit. Gutman had another strong year by retaining last years awards. The following photographs claimed the award which was "Carriage House" for Distinguished News Photography. Then "Lightning over the city" for Distinguished Feature Photography. Last, "Hit by pitch" had the wow factor in Distinguished Sports Photography. Gutman had a very recognizable year that caught NPPA attention, placing first in February for Spot News, March in Feature/Single and May for Spot News. He placed 2nd in the month of June for Spot News, while August for General News and October for Spot News as well. Even 3rd place as his as well for May under Feature/Single, August same group and October for General News.

Tiffany Towner, a former managing editor at The Daily News, was selected for Editor & Publisher's 2017 "25 under 35" list of the “next generation of newspaper publishing leaders.”

In 2017, The Daily News gained recognition at the New York Press Association's Better Newspaper Awards in a number of categories, including second place in Division Three editorials and first place in Division Three feature photos.

References 

Daily newspapers published in New York (state)
Genesee County, New York